Pearl Lang (May 29, 1921 – February 24, 2009) was an American dancer, choreographer and teacher renowned as an interpreter and propagator of the choreography style of Martha Graham, and also for her own longtime dance company, the Pearl Lang Dance Theater. She is known for Appalachian Spring (1944), American Masters (1985) and Driven (2001)

Career
A native of Chicago, Lang began her dance training as a child and studied acting at the Goodman Theatre. Her dance teacher was Frances Allis who taught movement for actors as well as her own modern dance technique which has many similarities to Graham's.  Lang studied Allis technique and performed with her company in Chicago.  In 1938, at the age of 17, she enrolled in a program for gifted students at the University of Chicago,  where she remained until 1941, the year of her move to New York.  Born Pearl Lack, she adopted the stage name, "Pearl Lang", she studied with Martha Graham and Louis Horst and joined the Martha Graham Dance Company where she remained as a soloist from 1942 to 1952, and as a guest artist from 1954 through the late 1970s.  She was the first woman to dance Martha Graham's roles in seven dances of Graham repertoire which she performed intermittently for thirty years to critical and audience acclaim.  She was an original cast member in Deaths and Entrances, Punch and the Judy, Land Be Bright, Imagined Wing, Diversion of Angels, Canticle for Innocent Comedians, Ardent Song, Dark Meadow, Night Journey, Eye of Anguish, and Appalachian Spring. She was also a featured dancer in Broadway productions of Carousel (1945–47), Finian's Rainbow, and Peer Gynt.

In 1952, she founded her own company, Pearl Lang Dance Theater, for which she choreographed sixty-three works, thirty-six of which were based on Jewish themes.  She choreographed for film, opera, and television and her works have been performed by the Dutch National Ballet, Boston Ballet, and the Batsheva Dance Company of Israel.  In 1970, she invited Alvin Ailey and his company to share a three-story building with her dance company at 229 East 59th Street in Manhattan where, together, they co-directed the American Dance Center as a joint school. Pearl Lang Dance Theater's last New York season was held at the Danny Kaye Playhouse in 2001.

Among the many citations and awards that Lang received are two Guggenheim Fellowships for Choreography; the Martha Graham Award for Performance and Choreography; The Workmen's Circle Award for her contribution to Jewish Culture through Dance; the Achievement Award from the Artists and Writers for Peace in the Middle East; the Achievement Award from the Congress for Jewish Culture; the Cultural Achievement Award from the National Foundation for Jewish Culture; Queens College Award for Excellence in Jewish Art, and from the Juilliard School, an Honorary Doctor of Fine Arts on May 19, 1995.  In 1997, she was inducted into the Hall of Fame by the International Committee for The Dance Library of Israel.  In 2001 at the American Dance Festival she received the award for "Lifetime Distinguished Teaching".

As a teacher, Lang reached generations of young dancers.  She served on the faculties of Yale University from 1954 to 1968, Juilliard School of Music from 1952 to 1969, Connecticut College and Neighborhood Playhouse from 1963 to 1968, and the Martha Graham School of Contemporary Dance up until shortly before her death. Among her many students were singer Madonna and choreographer Pina Bausch.

Lang was recuperating from hip surgery when she died of a heart attack in Manhattan, three months before her 88th birthday. She lived on the Upper West Side with her husband, actor Joseph Wiseman, to whom she had been married since 1964. Wiseman himself died less than eight months later, on October 19.

Films
Lang and Francisco Moncion dance performance:  Black Marigolds, music by Alan Hovhaness.  From a 1962 broadcast of CBS Sunday morning program Camera Three, directed by Nick Havinga and presented in cooperation with the New York State Education Department.
The Dybbuk for CBC

Choreographic works
 Song of Deborah, Moonsung and Windsung 1952
 Legend, Rites 1953
 And Joy is My Witness, Nightflight 1954
 Sky Chant 1957
 Persephone 1958
 Black Marigolds 1959
 Shirah 1960
 Apansionada 1961
 Broken Dialogues 1962
 Shore Bourne 1964
 Dismembered Fable 1965
 Pray for Dark Birds 1966
 Tongues of Fire 1967
 Piece for Brass 1969
 Moonways and Dark Tides 1970
 Sharjuhm 1971
 At That Point in Place and Time 1973
 The Possessed 1974
 Prairie Steps 1975
 Bach Rondelays, I Never Saw Another Butterfly, A Seder Night, Kaddish 1977
 Icarus, Cantigas Ladino 1978
 Notturno 1980
 Gypsy Ballad, Hanele the Orphan, The Tailor's Megilleh 1981
 Psalm, Song of Songs 1983
 Tehillim 1984
 Dance Panel #7 2000
 The Time is Out of Joint 2001

References

External links

"Pearl Lang, Dancer and Choreographer, Dies at 87", Anderson, Jack (The New York Times, February 26, 2009)

1922 births
2009 deaths
American choreographers
American female dancers
American dancers
Connecticut College faculty
Jewish American artists
Juilliard School faculty
Martha Graham
Modern dancers
University of Chicago alumni
Yale University faculty